Chapare (also called The Chapare, is a rural province in the northern region of Cochabamba Department in central Bolivia. The majority of the territory consists of valley rainforests that surround the area's main waterway, the Chapare River, which is also a tributary of the Amazon River. The provincial capital is Sacaba, 11 km east of Cochabamba. Its principal town is Villa Tunari, a popular tourist destination.

In recent decades, the Chapare province has become a haven for illegal cultivation of the coca plant, which can be used to produce cocaine. This is due to Bolivian drug law, which until recently only permitted the Yungas region to legally grow coca, despite Chapare being a historical area for growth due to its fertility. For this reason, Chapare has been a primary target for coca eradication in recent years, with frequent and heated clashes between the U.S. Drug Enforcement Administration and Bolivian cocaleros. The law has since been changed by a deal that was struck between Evo Morales (a former coca activist and the country's first indigenous President (2006-2019)) and former President Carlos Mesa. This deal permits the region to grow a limited amount of coca every year .

Subdivision 
Chapare Province is divided into three municipalities which are further subdivided into cantons.

Places of interest
 Carrasco National Park
 Inkachaka
 Isiboro Sécure National Park and Indigenous Territory
 Tunari National Park

See also 
 Chapare mammarenavirus
 Q'ara Apachita
 Q'inqu Mayu
 Uqi Salli Punta
 Villa Tunari – San Ignacio de Moxos Highway

References

External links
 Map of Chapare Province
 Provincia Chapare

Provinces of Cochabamba Department